Mount Gaberlein is a mountain,  high, standing  north-northwest of Mount Bellingshausen in the Prince Albert Mountains of Victoria Land, Antarctica. It was mapped by the United States Geological Survey from surveys and U.S. Navy air photos, 1957–62, and was named by the Advisory Committee on Antarctic Names for William E. Gaberlein, Chief Construction Electrician, U.S. Navy, who wintered over at McMurdo Station in 1962 and 1964.

References

Mountains of Victoria Land
Scott Coast